The Monza Grand Prix (Italian: Gran Premio di Monza) was an automobile race held at the Autodromo Nazionale di Monza at Monza, Italy.

Following the terrible accident during the 1928 Italian Grand Prix, where Emilio Materassi and 27 spectators lost their lives, the Italian Grand Prix was cancelled in 1929 and 1930. Not wanting to abandon racing at the Monza track completely, the Monza Grand Prix was held as a substitute during these years. Even when the Italian Grand Prix returned to the racing calendar, the Monza Grand Prix was retained as a separate event.

The competition was typically divided into three short (~30 minutes) heats according to engine size, one repechage and a longer final.

The 1933 event was to be known as the Black Sunday, due to 3 top drivers (Giuseppe Campari, Baconin Borzacchini and Stanisław Czaykowski) getting killed in two separate accidents at the south banking of the high speed loop. The racing world was stunned and this spelled the end, not only for the Monza Grand Prix, but also for Monza's original 10 km circuit. The Italian Grand Prix continued on during the following years, using a number of different layouts, with chicanes put in to slow down the speed.

After the Second World War the Gran Premio dell'Autodromo di Monza was run in five editions between 1948 and 1952. The first of these was a Formula One race and the rest Formula Two. None of them counted towards the World Championship.

The race was resumed in 1980, when the Italian F1 Grand Prix was raced in "Dino Ferrari" circuit in Imola, a Formula Two race was arranged.

Today, the Italian Grand Prix is sometimes referred to as "the Monza Grand Prix" since it is so closely associated with the Monza track.

Winners of the Monza Grand Prix

These are the winners of the Monza Grands Prix.

See also
Italian Grand Prix

References

 
Pre-World Championship Grands Prix
Auto races in Italy